Glodu may refer to several villages in Romania:

 Glodu, a village in Călineşti Commune, Argeș County
 Glodu, a village in Leordeni Commune, Argeș County
 Glodu, a village in Panaci Commune, Suceava County
 Glodu, a village in Dănicei Commune, Vâlcea County

See also 
 Glodu River (disambiguation)